José Ignacio Pérez Sáenz (born 7 November 1951) is a Spanish politician and former President of La Rioja between 1990 and 1995.

References

Presidents of La Rioja (Spain)
1951 births
Living people
Members of the 1st Parliament of La Rioja (Spain)
Members of the 2nd Parliament of La Rioja (Spain)
Members of the 3rd Parliament of La Rioja (Spain)
Members of the 4th Parliament of La Rioja (Spain)
Members of the 5th Parliament of La Rioja (Spain)